The 2017–18 División de Honor was the 51st season of the top flight of the Spanish domestic rugby union competition since its inception in 1953.

Valladolid won its second consecutive title, its eighth overall after defeating local arch-rivals SilverStorm El Salvador in the Final.

Competition format

The División de Honor season takes place between September and March, with every team playing each other home and away for a total of 22 matches. Points are awarded according to the following:
4 points for a win
2 points for a draw
1 bonus point is awarded to a team scoring 4 tries or more in a match
1 bonus point is awarded to a team that loses a match by 7 points or fewer

The six teams with the highest number of points at the end of 22 rounds of matches play the championship playoffs. The top two teams win a semifinal berth automatically, while the next four teams play off to take the remaining two spots.

The club which finishes bottom is relegated, while the club that finishes 11th goes into a playoff with a team from División de Honor B.

Promotion and relegation
The bottom team in the standings is relegated to División de Honor B, while the team finishing 11th play the relegation playoff. The top team from División de Honor B is promoted to División de Honor.

Teams

Results

Table

Playoffs

Relegation playoff
The relegation playoff was played over two legs by Hernani, the team finishing 11th in División de Honor and Ciencias Sevilla, the losing team from División de Honor B promotion playoff final. Hernani won 57-48 on aggregate and remained in the División de Honor A.

References

External links
Official site

Rugby union in Spain
2012-13
 
Spain